Kheyrud Kenar (also Romanized as Kheyrūd Kenār; also known as Kheyr Rūd Kenār) is a village in Kheyrud Kenar Rural District, in the Central District of Nowshahr County, Mazandaran Province, Iran. At the 2006 census, its population was 1,856, in 504 families.

References 

Populated places in Nowshahr County